Nemophila menziesii, known commonly as baby blue eyes or baby's-blue-eyes, is an annual herb, native to western North America.

Distribution
The plant is native to California, Baja California, and Oregon.

It grows virtually throughout California at elevations from sea level up to almost . It grows in many types of habitats, including chaparral, valley grasslands, and montane locales.

Description
Nemophila menziesii is variable in appearance. Lower leaves are stalked, lobed and oppositely arranged,  with five to thirteen lobes, each entire or with one to three teeth. Upper leaves are more or less sessile and less lobed than lower. The flower is blue with a white center or all white, usually with blue veins and black dots near the center. The tube is less than or equal to the filaments.

Varieties
The species includes three varieties:
Nemophila menziesii var. atomaria has white flowers with black dots, often with a faint blue tint or blue veins in the corolla. It is found on coastal bluffs or grassy slopes in Oregon, Northwestern California, the Central Coast of California, and the San Francisco Bay Area.
Nemophila menziesii var. integrifolia has blue flowers, with black dots at the center and deep blue veins. It is found in grasslands, canyons, woodlands, and slopes in the Central Coast, southern Coast Ranges, southwestern California, east of the Sierra Nevada range, and into the Mojave Desert and Baja California
Nemophila menziesii var. menziesii has bright blue flowers with white centers that are generally dotted with black. It is found virtually throughout California, in meadows, grasslands, chaparral, woodlands, slopes, and desert washes, but it does not occur above .

Cultivation
It is also cultivated as an ornamental plant, as annual wildflower in native plant, water conserving, traditional, and wildlife gardens.

It can occasionally be found outside its native range as an introduced species, such as in Alaska.

Gallery

References

External links
 
 Calflora Database: Nemophila menziesii (baby blue eyes)
 CalPhotos - Nemophila menziesii

menziesii
Flora of California
Flora of Baja California
Flora of Oregon
Flora of Wyoming
Flora of the California desert regions
Flora of the Cascade Range
Flora of the Great Basin
Flora of the Klamath Mountains
Flora of the Sierra Nevada (United States)
Natural history of the California chaparral and woodlands
Natural history of the California Coast Ranges
Natural history of the Peninsular Ranges
Natural history of the San Francisco Bay Area
Natural history of the Santa Monica Mountains
Natural history of the Transverse Ranges
Plants described in 1833
Flora without expected TNC conservation status